Liberal consensus may refer to:

 Embedded liberalism – post World War II international ambitions to combine free market and social policies
 Liberal consensus – the post World War II consensus in American politics
 Post-war consensus – the post World War II consensus in United Kingdom politics
 Washington Consensus – also referred to as the neoliberal consensus